Mas Flow 2 is the second compilation album by reggaeton producers Luny Tunes. The album was a joint venture with reggaeton artist Baby Ranks as he was featured in virtually every song in the album. Many of reggaeton's biggest names were featured in the album, such as Daddy Yankee, Wisin & Yandel, Zion & Lennox, Tito "El Bambino", Ivy Queen, Hector "El Father", Voltio, and many others. Mas Flow 2 is one of the most critically acclaimed Latin albums of the year, and is considered to be substantially superior to the previous album. It also featured some artists from outside the reggaeton genre, such as Frankie J, Cultura Profetica, Deevani, Tony Tun-Tun, Spliff Star, among others.

The song "Mírame" performed by Daddy Yankee and Deevani covers a 2001 Hindi song "Eli re Eli" from the Bollywood movie "Yaadein". Mas Flow 2 won the Lo Nuestro Award for Urban Album of the Year. Mas Flow 2 is one of the few reggaeton albums to sell over a million copies worldwide and remains as the most successful compilation in the genre's history. It was certified gold in 2006 by the RIAA for sales of over 500,000 copies in the United States alone.

The sound introduced in the albums Mas Flow 1 and Mas Flow 2 is noted for inspiring the modern day sound of the reggaeton genre in the music of artists such as J Balvin, Nicky Jam, Farruko and Anuel AA.

Track listing 

Disc two
 "Mas Flow Intro" (by Mr. Phillips, Zion, Baby Ranks, Alexis & Fido) (produced by Tainy) – 0:58
 "¡Qué! ¿Cómo?" (by Vico C) (produced by Luny Tunes) – 3:18
 "Tu Bailar" (by Baby Ranks) (produced by Luny Tunes, Nesty and Naldo) – 3:09
 "Querer y Amar" (by Joan, O'Neill and Baby Ranks) (produced by Luny Tunes) – 4:37
 "Salida" (by Baby Ranks and Bori (Cultura Profética) – 5:41
 "Ta To'" (by Spliff Star, N.O.R.E., Gems Star and Mr. Phillip) (produced by Luny Tunes) – 3:00

Mas Flow 2.5 
Mas Flow 2.5 (released on August 29, 2006), is a 2006 re-edition of Mas Flow 2.

 "Ponla Ahí" – Yo-Seph "The One" (produced by Luny Tunes and Tainy)
 "Alócate" – Zion (produced by Luny Tunes and Tainy)
 "Verme" – Baby Ranks featuring Notch
 "Mayor Que Yo" – Baby Ranks, Daddy Yankee, Tony Tun-Tun, Hector "El Father", Wisin & Yandel, Don Omar, Zion
 "Rakata" – Wisin & Yandel
 "Te He Querido, Te He Llorado" – Ivy Queen
 "Mírame (2)" – Daddy Yankee featuring Deevani and Tego Calderón
 "Dale Castigo" – Hector "El Father"
 "Es Mejor Olvidarlo" – Zion & Lennox featuring Baby Ranks
 "El Tiburón" – Alexis & Fido featuring Baby Ranks
 "Tortura" – Yaga & Mackie
 "Déjala Volar" – Tito "El Bambino"
 "Con Rabia" – Polaco
 "Sóbale El Pelo" – Tony Dize
 "Obsession" – Frankie J and Mr. Phillips
 "Acorralándome" – Trebol Clan
 "Gansta" – Voltio and Baby Ranks
 "Una Salida" – Baby Ranks and Bori

DVD 
 "Rakata" – Wisin & Yandel
 "El Tiburón" – Alexis & Fido featuring Baby Ranks
 "Mayor Que Yo" – Baby Ranks, Daddy Yankee, Tony Tun-Tun, Hector "El Father", Wisin & Yandel
 "Te He Querido, Te He Llorado" – Ivy Queen
 "Con Rabia" – Polaco
 "Dale Castigo" – Hector "El Father"
 "Sóbale El Pelo" – Tony Dize
 "Déjala Volar" – Tito "El Bambino"
 "Alócate" – Zion

Chart performance

Sales and certifications

References 
 

Reggaeton compilation albums
2005 compilation albums
2005 video albums
Music video compilation albums
Luny Tunes albums
Albums produced by Noriega
Albums produced by Luny Tunes
Albums produced by Nely